The Embassy of Slovakia in London is the diplomatic mission of the Slovak Republic in the United Kingdom. It is located at the junction of Kensington Palace Gardens and Bayswater Road in a compound previously shared with the Embassy of the Czech Republic until 1993.

The Embassy of Czechoslovakia was originally located on Grosvenor Place, before moving to the location of the current Czech and Slovak embassies in 1970. The construction of a new brutalist-style building at this site had begun in 1965 and was undertaken by Jan Bočan, Jan Šrámek and Karel Štěpánský from the atelier Beta Prague Project Institute; it received an award from the Royal Institute of British Architects for the best building in the United Kingdom created by foreign architects. The building was then divided between Czechia and Slovakia following the dissolution of Czechoslovakia in 1993.

Gallery

References

External links
Official site

Slovakia
Diplomatic missions of Slovakia
Slovakia–United Kingdom relations
Buildings and structures in the Royal Borough of Kensington and Chelsea
Holland Park